And TV (stylized as &tv) is a Hindi language entertainment channel owned by Zee Entertainment Enterprises. Launched as a general entertainment channel from ZEEL group, it started broadcasting on 2 March 2015. On 1 June 2019, &TV closed down in the UK due to the launch of  ZEE5; Zee TV and ZEE5 will air most of its former programmes.

Programming

References

External links 
 

Television channels and stations established in 2015
Zee Entertainment Enterprises
Hindi-language television stations
Hindi-language television channels in India
Television stations in Mumbai
2015 establishments in Maharashtra